Fort Harrison National Cemetery is a United States National Cemetery located seven miles (11 km) south of the city of Richmond, in Henrico County, Virginia. Administered by the United States Department of Veterans Affairs, It encompasses , and as of the end of 2005, had 1,570 interments.

The cemetery was established in 1866.  It was listed on the National Register of Historic Places in 1995.

History
Established after the American Civil War as a place to reinter the Union dead from the various battlefield sites around the area, including from the Battle of Chaffin's Farm. The majority of interments at the cemetery are unknown, and also includes four Confederate prisoners of war that were held at the Fort during the time it was held by the Union.

Notable interments
 Private George A. Buchanan (1842–1864), Medal of Honor recipient for action at the Battle of Chaffin's Farm during the Civil War.

References

External links
 National Cemetery Administration
 Fort Harrison National Cemetery
 
 
 

Cemeteries in Richmond, Virginia
Protected areas of Henrico County, Virginia
United States national cemeteries
Virginia in the American Civil War
National Register of Historic Places in Henrico County, Virginia
Second Empire architecture in Virginia
1866 establishments in Virginia
Cemeteries on the National Register of Historic Places in Virginia
Historic American Landscapes Survey in Virginia